Michael Crowe, Mayor of Galway 2010–11.

A native of Bohermore and a member of the Crowe family who manage Crowes Bar, Crowe was first elected to Galway City Council in 2004 as an independent topping the poll. He became a member of Fianna Fáil in 2006. He was re-elected to the City Council in 2009, his brother Ollie was also successful in those elections. He is the party's first Mayor since the election of Val Hanley in 2002 and also the first Mayor from Bohermore. 

He failed election to the Dáil during the 2007 General Election, receiving almost five thousand first preference votes in Galway West and being deemed eliminated on the last count.

References

 https://web.archive.org/web/20100626053250/http://www.galwaynews.ie/13516-bohermore-councillor-new-city-mayor-pact-holds-firm
 http://www.galwayindependent.com/profiles/profiles/michael-crowe-%11-mayor-of-galway-city/

External links
 Official website
 https://web.archive.org/web/20100329134252/http://www.galwaycity.ie/AllServices/YourCouncil/CouncilMembers/GalwayCityEast/
 https://www.youtube.com/watch?v=7LEh2J7dAhs

Year of birth missing (living people)
Living people
Fianna Fáil politicians
Mayors of Galway
Politicians from County Galway
Local councillors in Galway (city)